Sofia Cilenti (born 20 January 1995) is an Italian professional racing cyclist. She signed to ride for the UCI Women's Team  for the 2019 women's road cycling season.

References

External links
 

1995 births
Living people
Italian female cyclists
Place of birth missing (living people)
Cyclists from Turin